The following are flora species present at Toro Negro State Forest in Ponce, Puerto Rico.

 Buchenavia capitata
 Caribbean pine
 Dacryodes excelsa
 Eucalyptus robusta
 Ilex cookii
 Magnolia portoricensis
 Manilkara zapota
 Neolamarckia cadamba
 Ocotea moschata
 Pouteria multiflora
 Prestoea montana
 Prunus occidentalis
 Swietenia macrophylla
 Talipariti elatum
 Thelypteris inabonensis
 Thespesia grandiflora
 Vitex divaricata

See also

References

Toro Negro State Forest
Ponce, Puerto Rico